KKAI (channel 50) is a religious independent television station licensed to Kailua, Hawaii, United States, serving the Hawaiian Islands. The station is owned by Kailua Television, LLC, and maintains a transmitter north of Kailua. Since March 2018, the station is available statewide on Oceanic Spectrum digital channel 50.

History

The station first hit the air in 2004. Originally intended to sign on as a UPN affiliate, it began airing family programming from Faith TV in addition to local programming. In 2012, the station became a full-time affiliate of the Retro Television Network. In 2017, the station switched to a religious format.

In late 2018, KKAI added Telemundo programming on its second digital subchannel, simulcasting Kailua-Kona–based KFVE.

Technical information

Subchannels
The station's digital signal is multiplexed:

Analog-to-digital conversion
Because it was granted an original construction permit after the FCC finalized the DTV allotment plan on April 21, 1997 , the station did not receive a second (companion) channel for a digital television station. On January 15, 2009, KKAI flash-cut to a digital signal on the same channel.

On April 13, 2017, the FCC announced that KKAI would relocate to RF channel 29 by April 12, 2019 as a result of the broadcast incentive auction.

References

External links
Official website

KAI
Television channels and stations established in 2004
Retro TV affiliates
2004 establishments in Hawaii